Stanoje Stanojević (1874 in Novi Sad – 1937 in Belgrade) was a Serbian historian, university professor, academic and a leader of many scientific and publishing enterprises.

Career
Stanojević finished university studies in Belgrade's Grandes écoles and post-graduate studies in philosophy in Vienna, where he received his PhD in 1896. He was a student of Konstantin Jireček, Vatroslav Jagić and Karl Krumbacher, and a follower of Ilarion Ruvarac and his school of historiography. Stanojević belongs to the first generation of Serbian historians educated abroad, at European universities. In 1903, he became a professor of the Grande école (University of Belgrade), his alma mater. During Austro-Hungarian occupation of Serbia in World War I, Stanojević escaped to Sankt Petersburg, where he taught at the university as a visiting professor. From 1917, he lectured at Sorbonne and at the University of London. After the war, in 1919, Stanojević resumed his chair as professor of National History at the University of Belgrade until 1937, the time of his death.

He was a broadly cultured man of many interests, he had profound knowledge of history, knew Latin, Greek, Old Church Slavonic and major European languages. His basic orientation was mediaeval history of Serbia and the Serbian lands, primarily the early Middle Ages and the time of the Nemanja dynasty. He was one of the founders of the Byzantine studies in Serbia. Stanoje Stnaojević is the author of six hundred and sixteen works, and the most popular are Byzantium and the Serbs and The History of the Serbian People. Stanojević's interest in the relations between Serbia and the Byzantine empire, from the beginning of the 20th century, almost completely ceased in his later years, with the significant exception of his fruitful Serbian diplomatic studies, which also included the Byzantine component.

He was also the editor of the first Popular Serbian-Croatian-Slovenian Encyclopaedia. Stanojević organized himself and initiated the establishment of historic societies. He was a member of the Serbian Academy of Sciences and Arts and a corresponding member of science academies in Bucharest, Prague and Munich.

Works
Stanojević wrote many books about history of Serbia and history of the Serbs, including:
 Byzantium and the Serbs ("Vizantija i Srbi")
 Saint Sava ("Sveti Sava")
 Stefan Lazarević's biography ("Biografija Stefana Lazarevića od Konstantina filozofa")
 Studies on Serbian diplomacy ("Studije o srpskoj diplomatici")
 World War 1 serbia
 History of the Serbian People ("Istorija srpskog naroda")
 About South Slavs in the 6th, 7th, 8th centuries ("O Južnim Slovenima u VI, VII, VIII veku")
 From our past ("Iz naše prošlosti"), 1934

He also organized and arranged the "Great National Encyclopedia of Serbs, Croats and Slovenes" ("Velika Narodna enciklopedija Srba, Hrvata i Slovenaca"), which was the first work of the kind written in Serbian language.
 Great National Encyclopedia of Serbs, Croats and Slovenes 1
 Great National Encyclopedia of Serbs, Croats and Slovenes 2
 Great National Encyclopedia of Serbs, Croats and Slovenes 3
 Great National Encyclopedia of Serbs, Croats and Slovenes 4

References
 Stanoje Stanojević. Istorija srpskog naroda, Beograd, 2009
 Jovan Mirosavljević, Brevijar ulica Novog Sada 1745-2001, Novi Sad, 2002

External links
 Brief biography of Stanoje Stanojević (in Serbian)
 "History of Bosnia and Herzegovina", written by Stanoje Stanojević (in Serbian)

1874 births
1937 deaths
Writers from Novi Sad
Serbs of Vojvodina
20th-century Serbian historians
Serbian Byzantinists
Serbian medievalists
20th-century Serbian philosophers
Academic staff of the University of Belgrade
Scholars of Byzantine history